Trifurcula aerifica is a moth of the family Nepticulidae. It was described by Edward Meyrick in 1915. It is known from Peru.

References

Nepticulidae
Moths of South America
Moths described in 1915